Down the Road is the twenty-ninth studio album by Northern Irish singer Van Morrison (see 2002 in music).  The album has a nostalgic tone, lyrically and musically, and its arrangements mix R&B and blues with country and folk, and with a few exceptions, like "Georgia on My Mind," the music is most often rooted in 1950s and early 1960s popular music.

The album charted at #6 in the UK and #26 in the US, while consistently charting in the top 20 across Europe.

Recording
The album was originally recorded with singer and pianist Linda Gail Lewis within a month of the release of You Win Again. It was originally entitled Choppin' Wood, but Morrison re-recorded it, removing Linda Gail Lewis' contributions to the songs and deleting other songs from the album. Morrison recorded another nine songs to the album in late 2001 and retitled it Down the Road. The songs that were included  were increased from an original ten to fifteen tracks and a lengthy sixty-seven minutes. One of the original songs, "Just Like Greta", that was not included on the album would appear on Morrison's 2005 release Magic Time, without a rerecording.  It was finished by year's end in 2001 and released after numerous delays.

Composition
The songs on the album lean towards the blues the singer listened to in his youth. The title track  was originally entitled "Down the Road I Go" and was first recorded in 1981 with guitarist Mark Knopfler. The song was then re-recorded with Linda Gail Lewis in November 2000 with additional lyrics. "Choppin' Wood" is a tribute to the singer's father, George Morrison, who had died suddenly from a heart attack more than a decade earlier. In "The Beauty of the Days Gone By", Morrison attempts to come to terms with approaching old age. In the song "Whatever Happened to P.J. Proby?" Morrison refers to musicians P. J. Proby and Scott Walker and makes political references to Screaming Lord Sutch, the former leader of the British Monster Raving Loony Party, who died in 1999. In the second verse of the song Morrison claims that he

Don't have no frame of reference no more
Not even Screaming Lord Sutch
Without him now there's no Raving Loony Party
Nowadays I guess there's not much

Reception

Down the Road was commercially and critically one of  Morrison's  most successful albums. It charted higher in the U.S. than any of Morrison's albums since 1972's Saint Dominic's Preview.

John Metzger of  The Music Box wrote, "every few years, Morrison manages to tap into some magical space that sums up both his career and his influence in one fell swoop ... not that they're all that groundbreaking, they're just penultimate pieces of perfection. Such is the case with his latest near-masterpiece Down the Road, which finds him fondly recalling the folk, blues, and jazz to which he grew up listening."

Pop Matters critic John Kriecbergs stated in his review: "Bolstered by yet another outstanding collection of backing musicians, ... Down the Road rivals some of Morrison's strongest work."

Cover
The album cover depicts the front of a record store with a window full of LP covers by blues, R&B, jazz, and old rock & roll artists, a deliberate blueprint of the album's influences. The shop pictured was a real record store, Nashers Music Store in Walcot Street, Bath, UK, specially dressed for the photo-shoot.

Track listing
All songs by Van Morrison except as indicated.
"Down the Road" – 4:15
"Meet Me in the Indian Summer" – 3:57
"Steal My Heart Away" – 4:20
"Hey Mr. DJ" – 3:45
"Talk Is Cheap" – 4:19
"Choppin' Wood" – 3:26
"What Makes the Irish Heart Beat" – 3:47
"All Work and No Play" – 4:51
"Whatever Happened to P.J. Proby?" – 3:13
"The Beauty of the Days Gone By" – 5:45
"Georgia on My Mind" (Hoagy Carmichael, Stuart Gorrell) – 5:35
"Only a Dream" – 4:57
"Man Has to Struggle" – 5:07
"Evening Shadows" (Acker Bilk, Morrison) – 4:01
"Fast Train" – 5:01

Personnel

Musicians
Van Morrison – acoustic guitar, harmonica, alto saxophone, vocals
Mick Green – acoustic and electric guitars
Johnny Scott – electric guitar, background vocals
David Hayes – bass guitar, double bass
Pete Hurley – bass guitar
Bob Loveday – violin
Jake Walker – viola
Rosie Wetters – cello, string section leader
Fiachra Trench – piano
Richard Dunn – piano, Hammond organ
Geraint Watkins – piano, Hammond organ
John Allair – Hammond organ
Acker Bilk – clarinet
Martin Winning – clarinet, tenor saxophone
Lee Goodall – tenor, alto and baritone saxophones, flute, background vocals
Matt Holland – trumpet, flugelhorn, background vocals
Crawford Bell – background vocals
Olwin Bell – background vocals
Siobhan Pettit – background vocals
Aine Whelan – background vocals
Karen Hamill – background vocals
Colin Griffin – drums
Bobby Irwin – drums

Production
Van Morrison – producer
Stuart Bruce – engineer
Tim Cooper – mastering
Walter Samuel – engineer, mixing
Ben Sidran – liner notes
Peter Thorpe – photography
Johnny Scott, Aine Whelan – vocal arrangement
Fiachra Trench – string arrangement

Charts

Album
UK Album Chart (United Kingdom)

Billboard (North America)

Certifications

Notes

References
Heylin, Clinton (2003). Can You Feel the Silence? Van Morrison: A New Biography, Chicago Review Press, 
Rogan, Johnny (2006). Van Morrison: No Surrender, London: Vintage Books  

2002 albums
Van Morrison albums
Albums produced by Van Morrison